It's Great to Be Alive is the second full-length album from indie-punk band Fake Problems.  It was released February 17, 2009 and is their first for Side One Dummy since joining the label in November 2008.

A video for the song "Dream Team" was filmed in January 2009; it was the band's first video.  The band invited fans and friends to the video shoot to appear in the video.

Track listing

Album personnel
 Chris Farren - Vocals and Guitar
 Derek Perry - Bass
 Sean Stevenson - Drums
 Casey Lee - Guitar

References

2009 albums
Fake Problems albums